In the behavioural sciences (e.g. psychology, biology, neurosciences), an experimental paradigm,  is an experimental setup or way of conducting a certain type of experiment (a protocol) that is defined by certain fine-tuned standards, and often has a theoretical background. A paradigm in this technical sense, however, is not a way of thinking as it is in the epistemological meaning (paradigm).

The more paradigms which are attempted, and the more variables within a single paradigm are attempted, with the same results, the more sure one is of the results, that, "the effect is a true one and not merely a product of artifacts engendered by the use of a particular paradigm." The three core factors of paradigm design may be considered: "(a) ...the 'nuts and bolts' of the paradigm itself...; (b) ...implementation concerns...; and (c) resources available."

For example, the stop-signal paradigm, "is a popular experimental paradigm to study response inhibition." The cooperative pulling paradigm is used to study cooperation. The weather prediction test is a paradigm used to study procedural learning. Other examples include Skinner boxes, rat mazes, and trajectory mapping.

See also
Glossary of experimental design
Randomized controlled trial

References

External links
(2013) "Figure 1: Experimental paradigm" example, Nature.com.
 "Discovering Optimal Training Policies: A New Experimental Paradigm" .PPT, SlideServe.com.

Design of experiments